Mycodrosophila claytonae is a species of fruit flies, insects in the family Drosophilidae.

References

External links

 

Drosophilidae
Articles created by Qbugbot
Insects described in 1963